Arthur Stanley Maxwell (January 14, 1896 – November 13, 1970), otherwise known as Uncle Arthur, was an author, editor, and administrator of the Seventh-day Adventist Church.

Biography

Maxwell was born in London, England. During his teenage years he was schooled at Stanborough College upon the insistence of his mother. At age 16, Maxwell worked for a period as a literature evangelist, before becoming a copyreader at Stanborough Press. On May 3, 1917, Maxwell married Rachel Elizabeth Joyce, a proofreader at the office, with whom he had four sons and two daughters.

Maxwell began writing articles for British Adventist journal The Present Truth. During this period he also had articles published in the Signs of the Times. In 1920, Maxwell became editor of The Present Truth and until 1927 was also manager and treasurer of the Stanborough Press, pastor of a nearby church, official Adventist spokesman for church-state affairs in Britain, and editor of a health journal.

In 1936, Maxwell and his family moved from England to Palo Alto, California, in the United States. There he took a job as editor of the very publication that had published his first serious adult article – Signs of the Times. When he arrived, circulation of the magazine stood at 55,000. When Maxwell retired 34 years later, the circulation of the Signs of the Times magazine had increased to 335,000.

He wrote a total of 112 books during his lifetime, and is known affectionately by Adventists around the world as "Uncle Arthur." His most notable publications include the Bedtime Stories and The Bible Story volume sets. The simple stories are morality tales that illustrate values such as honesty, diligence, obedience, and selflessness.  Volume 1 of The Bible Story, which tells the story of Genesis, upholds the historicity of the Bible account, including the creation of life on earth during a six-day creation 6,000 years ago. 

Arthur's children Maureen, Graham, Lawrence and Mervyn have also done their own writing.

Film adaptation
In 2006, Maxwell's book Secret of the Cave was turned into a feature film of the same name by students and faculty at Southern Adventist University. The direct to DVD film won the 2006 Crystal Heart Award from the Heartland Film Festival in Indianapolis, Indiana, and received the Dove Family-Approved seal.

References

Bibliography

External links
 Uncle Arthur's Online
 Articles by Maxwell as catalogued in the Seventh-day Adventist Periodical Index (SDAPI)

Seventh-day Adventist religious workers
1896 births
1970 deaths
English Seventh-day Adventists
English male novelists
20th-century English novelists
20th-century English male writers